Knottingley is a town, and Ferrybridge is a village, in the Knottingley ward in the metropolitan borough of the City of Wakefield, West Yorkshire, England.  They contain eight listed buildings that are recorded in the National Heritage List for England.  All the listed buildings are designated at Grade II, the lowest of the three grades, which is applied to "buildings of national importance and special interest".  The listed buildings consist of two churches, houses, a former toll house, two war memorials, and a building in a former power station.


Buildings

References

Citations

Sources

 

Lists of listed buildings in West Yorkshire